The 1935 All-Southern Conference football team consists of American football players chosen by the Associated Press (AP) and United Press (UP) for the All-Southern Conference football team for the 1935 college football season.

All-Southern Conference selections

Quarterbacks
 Ace Parker, Duke (AP-1)

Halfbacks
 Don Jackson, North Carolina (AP-1)
 Bill Guckeyson, Maryland (AP-1)

Fullbacks
 Herman Dickerson, Virginia Polytechnic (AP-1)

Ends
 Dick Buck, North Carolina (AP-1)
 John Leys, Virginia (AP-1)

Tackles
 Hugo Bonino, Washington & Lee (AP-1)
 Gus Durner, Duke (AP-1)

Guards
 Jim Johnston, Duke (AP-1)
 Jim Farley, VMI (AP-1)

Centers
 Steve Sabol, North Carolina State (AP-1)

Key
AP = Associated Press

UP = United Press

See also
1935 College Football All-America Team

References

All-Southern Conference football team
All-Southern Conference football teams